Peter R. Kowey is an American cardiologist and medical researcher. He is Professor of Medicine and Clinical Pharmacology at Jefferson Medical College of Thomas Jefferson University and holds the William Wikoff Smith Chair in Cardiovascular Research at Lankenau Institute for Medical Research.

Early life and education 
He graduated from Saint Joseph’s College (now Saint Joseph’s University) in 1971 with a B.S. in biology and from medical school at the University of Pennsylvania in 1975; he was an intern and resident at Penn State Milton S. Hershey Medical Center from 1975 and 1978. He held a fellowship in cardiology at Harvard School of Public Health and Peter Bent Brigham Hospital from 1978 to 1980, and a fellowship in cardiovascular medicine at the West Roxbury Veterans Administration Hospital and Harvard Medical School from 1980 to 1981.

Career
Kowey is a fellow of the Clinical Council of the American Heart Association, the American College of Cardiology, the American College of Physicians, the College of Physicians of Philadelphia, the American College of Chest Physicians, and the American College of Clinical Pharmacology. Kowey has been a consultant to the United States Food and Drug Administration.

Selected publications 
He has edited or co-edited three peer-reviewed journal supplements and several books, including “Cardiac Arrhythmia: Mechanisms, Diagnosis, and Management” (2001);  “Clinical Management of Atrial Fibrillation” (2015); and “Cardiac Arrhythmias, Pacing and Sudden Death” (2017).

His most-cited publications include:

 
Kowey PR, Eisenberg R, Engel TR (1984). “Electrophysiological Testing for Sustained Arrhythmias in Patients with Hypertrophic Obstructive Cardiomyopathy”. N Engl J Med; 310 (24):1566-9.
. 
 

Kowey PR, Reiffel JA, Ellenbogen KA, Naccarelli GV, Pratt CM (2010). “Efficacy and Safety of Prescription Omega-3 Fatty Acids for the Prevention of Symptomatic Atrial Fibrillation”. JAMA; 304 (21): 2363-72.
Kowey PR and Robinson V (2020). “The Relentless Pursuit of New Drugs to Treat Cardiac Arrhythmias”.  Circulation; 141 (19): 1507-9.

Around 2005 he started writing medical murder mysteries, in which the protagonist is named Philip Sarkis.

Awards 

 Medical Clerkship, Oxford University
 Bradley and Shaffrey Awards, St. Joseph’s University
 Edward S. Cooper Award, American Heart Association

References 

1950 births
Living people
American cardiologists
Thomas Jefferson University faculty
Saint Joseph's University alumni
Perelman School of Medicine at the University of Pennsylvania alumni